Šmalčja Vas is a settlement immediately north of the town of Šentjernej in southeastern Slovenia. The Municipality of Šentjernej is part of the traditional region of Lower Carniola. It is now included in the Southeast Slovenia Statistical Region.

References

External links
Šmalčja Vas on Geopedia

Populated places in the Municipality of Šentjernej